Soko, or So (also Eso, Gesogo, Heso, Soa) is a language spoken, 1971, by about 6,000 people in the Orientale Province, north of Basoko in the Democratic Republic of the Congo.

References

Soko-Kele languages